The King Estate (also known as Baywood, or the Alexander King Estate, also referenced to as the King Mansion by the local children) located at 5501 Elgin Street in the Highland Park neighborhood of Pittsburgh, Pennsylvania, was built in 1880.  Alexander King was the original owner of this Second Empire style house.  It was added to the List of City of Pittsburgh historic designations on November 12, 1992, and the List of Pittsburgh History and Landmarks Foundation Historic Landmarks in 2000.

References

Houses in Pittsburgh
Second Empire architecture in Pennsylvania
Houses completed in 1880
Gilded Age mansions